Gun is a hill at the southern end of the Peak District, overlooking the town of Leek in the Staffordshire Moorlands. The hill is mainly moorland with some small wooded areas. Neighbouring peaks to the east are The Roaches, Hen Cloud and Ramshaw Rocks. It is a nature reserve of the Staffordshire Wildlife Trust.

Description
The hill has height , and there is a trig point at the summit.

Gun has the Summits on the Air reference G/SP-013. The hill often features in the itinerary of the Tour of Britain cycle race.

Gun Moor
Gun Moor, area , is a nature reserve of the Staffordshire Wildlife Trust. There is moorland, woodland and blanket bog. Uncommon species of bird such as lesser redpoll and cuckoo may be seen, and bog asphodel flowers in the summer. There is a circular walk, over hilly terrain, that takes 1½ to 2½ hours.

Gun Moor was purchased when it came to the market in 2019. The Trust was aware that the moor was important and that it did not carry any protection; in order to secure the site, it was purchased by the Esmée Fairbairn Foundation, and the Trust agreed to buy the site within two years, at the original price. After donations from individuals and charitable trusts, this was achieved. Jeff Sim, Head of Nature Reserves and species recovery, said: "The habitat Gun Moor contains is what makes the Peak District Moors of international significance, so it is really important that the Trust was able to purchase and protect it."

Gun Moor Meadow
During summer 2022, the Trust took out a loan to buy Gun Moor Meadow, bordering the north western edge of Gun Moor. In January 2023 the Trust announced that, thanks to donations, it was able to repay the loan.

The meadow has area . The land will be allowed to rewet, by filling in drainage ditches, and cattle will lightly graze at certain times of the year, so that bog asphodel and cranberry will be re-established; the land will attract wildlife whose habitat has been reduced in recent years.

References

Marilyns of England
Mountains and hills of the Peak District
Hills of Staffordshire
Nature reserves in Staffordshire
Forests and woodlands of Staffordshire
Moorlands of England
Climbs in cycle racing in the United Kingdom
Bogs of England